Odland can mean

Bruce Odland, see Helen Hayes Awards Resident Design and Starkland
Sigurd Odland, see MF Norwegian School of Theology
Steve Odland, American businessman
Ödland, the French music band
, a Norwegian cargo ship in service  1908-22
, a Norwegian cargo ship in service 1922-28

See also
Aadland